Black Walk is a Canadian film and television production company located in Whitby, Ontario, Canada. The former music video production company is now known for producing films, television programs, and the Dark Rising series.

History
Black Walk was founded in 1992 by Mihkel Harilaid, David Fowler, and Steph Scott. During the 1990s, Black Walk produced over 500 music videos for numerous American and Canadian performers including Shaggy, Creed, Alanis Morissette, and Nickelback.

Black Walk began producing feature films starting with Washed Up in 2000. Notable film credits since then include the 2005 Independent Spirit Award winner Phil the Alien; the 2004 feature film Ham & Cheese, starring Dave Foley, Jason Jones, and Samantha Bee; the 2007 sci-fi-comedy Dark Rising, which was nominated for numerous awards at the 13th Canadian Comedy Awards; and Medium Raw: Night of the Wolf, an action-thriller starring John-Rhys Davies, William B. Davis, and Mercedes McNab. 

Black Walk has continued to produce the Dark Rising franchise which includes filming the new series Dark Rising: Warrior of Worlds in Sudbury, Ontario along with the help of the Northern Ontario Film Studio.

Currently, Black Walk is in post-production for a Christian Television series, Reflections for the DayStar Network.

Filmography

References

External links
Defiantfilms.com

Film production companies of Canada
Television production companies of Canada
Companies based in Ontario
Video production companies